Yaw Berko (born 13 October 1980, in Accra) is a Ghanaian football player who plays for Liberty Professionals FC.

Career 
Berko began his career by Liberty Professionals FC and was in January 2005 loaned out to Vietnamese top club Pisico Bình Định F.C. after 1 year he turned back to Liberty. On 14 December 2009 left Liberty Professionals FC and joined on loan to Young Africans FC.

Titles 
Was adjudged the most valuable player of the match Vs. Sekondi Hasaacas F.C. on 25 June  2008.

References

Living people
Ghanaian footballers
Ghanaian expatriate footballers
Association football goalkeepers
Liberty Professionals F.C. players
Ghanaian expatriate sportspeople in Vietnam
Expatriate footballers in Vietnam
Expatriate footballers in Tanzania
Young Africans S.C. players
Tanzanian Premier League players
1980 births